Mikhail Aleksandrovich Evstafiev (born in 1963) is a Russian artist, photographer, and writer.

His interest in painting and photography began at an early age. His mother, grandmother and great grandfather – all prominent Russian sculptors – inspired him to develop his own style in art. His work is listed in "Allgemeines Künstlerlexikon" (The World Biographical Dictionary of Artists).

In the late 1980s he volunteered to serve in Afghanistan and spent two years in the Soviet army, stationed in Kabul, witnessing the numerous combat operations and the 1989 withdrawal of Soviet troops. He later published the novel Two Steps From Heaven about the Soviet invasion of Afghanistan.

Working for leading international news organizations in the 1990s, he also covered the wars and armed conflicts in Bosnia and Herzegovina, Chechnya, Georgia, Nagorno-Karabakh, Tajikistan and Transdniestria, as well as the Soviet coup attempt of 1991 and the Russian constitutional crisis of 1993.

Mikhail Evstafiev's paintings and photographs have been exhibited in different countries, including in Austria, China, Russia and the United States, in places such as the Hofburg Congress Centre, the State Kremlin Palace, the Maly Manezh Exhibition Hall and the Central House of Artists in Moscow, and in the Grand Central Terminal in New York City.

His paintings and photographs are in the collections of the Moscow House of Photography and SOLMS, Gallery der Leica Camera AG, and in private collections in Andorra, Austria, Britain, France, Poland, Russia and the United States. His work appeared in leading international magazines and newspapers and was published in numerous books.

See also
List of Russian artists

References

External links

Mikhail Evstafiev's official website
Alien in London photo essay
Slant Magazine review of I Am Cuba: The Ultimate Edition DVD
The Guardian on new publication
Two Steps From Heaven in Foto8 Magazine
Galerie Am Roten Hof in Vienna presents paintings by M.Evstafiev (in German)
Two Steps From Heaven review in Nezavisimaya gazeta (in Russian)

1963 births
Living people
Writers from Moscow
Russian photographers
Soviet photographers
War photographers
Photography in Afghanistan
20th-century Russian painters
Russian male painters
21st-century Russian painters
Soviet military personnel of the Soviet–Afghan War
Soviet military personnel
20th-century Russian male artists
21st-century Russian male artists